Anteros Coachworks Inc. is an American sports car manufacturer based in California. The Anteros is based on the C6 Corvette and produces 500+ supercharged horsepower.

References

Car manufacturers of the United States
Motor vehicle manufacturers based in California
Manufacturing companies based in San Jose, California
2005 establishments in California
American companies established in 2005
Vehicle manufacturing companies established in 2005
Sports car manufacturers